The Tour de Flores is a one-day cycling race in Indonesia. It is part of UCI Asia Tour in category 1.2.

Winners

References

Cycle races in Indonesia
UCI Asia Tour races
Recurring sporting events established in 2016
2016 establishments in Indonesia